Jim Larkin (born February 7, 1939) is a former American football player and coach.  Larkin was the head football coach at Saginaw Valley State University in University Center, Michigan for three seasons, from 1980 until 1982.  His coaching record at Saginaw Valley State was 9–22.

References

1939 births
Living people
American football tackles
Hillsdale Chargers football players
Saginaw Valley State Cardinals football coaches